The 2009 Cal Poly Mustangs football team represented California Polytechnic State University during the 2009 NCAA Division I FCS football season.

Cal Poly competed in the Great West Conference (GWC). The 2009 Mustangs were led by first-year head coach Tim Walsh and played home games at Mustang Stadium in San Luis Obispo, California. The team finished the season with a record of four wins and seven losses (4–7, 1–3 GWC). The Mustangs were outscored by their opponents 258–303 for the season.

Schedule

Notes

References

Cal Poly
Cal Poly Mustangs football seasons
Cal Poly Mustangs football